Michael Doughty (born 5 August 1979) is a former Australian rules footballer who played for the Adelaide Football Club in the Australian Football League (AFL) between 2000 and 2012. He is now playing for Reynella Football Club in the Southern Football League, where he played junior football.

Originally from South Adelaide Football Club in the South Australian National Football League (SANFL), Doughty was drafted by Adelaide with their first choice (fourth overall) at the 1999 Rookie Draft and elevated to Adelaide's senior list in 2000 when he made his senior AFL debut.

Known as a solid utility player, Doughty has most often used as a midfielder, tagger or a small defender. Doughty played his 150th game in round 8, 2009 and his 200th game in Round 15, 2011. Adelaide defeated Sydney by seven points to end a record-equalling six-match losing streak in this match.  He retired at the end of the 2012 season, having played in 24 of Adelaide's 25 matches, only missing one game when his wife Sara gave birth to his son, Max.  He joined sports management company Elite Sports Properties as a player manager after retiring as a player.

Statistics
 Statistics are correct to end of AFL career

|- style="background-color: #EAEAEA"
! scope="row" style="text-align:center" | 2000
|  || 41 || 2 || 0 || 1 || 3 || 4 || 7 || 1 || 1 || 0.0 || 0.5 || 1.5 || 2.0 || 3.5 || 0.5 || 0.5
|-
! scope="row" style="text-align:center" | 2001
|  || 11 || 3 || 0 || 0 || 11 || 4 || 15 || 6 || 2 || 0.0 || 0.0 || 3.7 || 1.3 || 5.0 || 2.0 || 0.7
|- style="background-color: #EAEAEA"
! scope="row" style="text-align:center" | 2002
|  || 11 || 25 || 13 || 5 || 220 || 161 || 381 || 95 || 39 || 0.5 || 0.2 || 8.8 || 6.4 || 15.2 || 3.8 || 1.6
|-
! scope="row" style="text-align:center" | 2003
|  || 11 || 6 || 3 || 3 || 46 || 30 || 76 || 23 || 11 || 0.5 || 0.5 || 7.7 || 5.0 || 12.7 || 3.8 || 1.8
|- style="background-color: #EAEAEA"
! scope="row" style="text-align:center" | 2004
|  || 11 || 17 || 4 || 5 || 117 || 114 || 231 || 70 || 55 || 0.2 || 0.3 || 6.9 || 6.7 || 13.6 || 4.1 || 3.2
|-
! scope="row" style="text-align:center" | 2005
|  || 11 || 24 || 1 || 5 || 129 || 176 || 305 || 90 || 52 || 0.0 || 0.2 || 5.4 || 7.3 || 12.7 || 3.8 || 2.2
|- style="background-color: #EAEAEA"
! scope="row" style="text-align:center" | 2006
|  || 11 || 23 || 8 || 5 || 241 || 235 || 476 || 137 || 69 || 0.4 || 0.2 || 10.5 || 10.2 || 20.7 || 6.0 || 3.0
|-
! scope="row" style="text-align:center" | 2007
|  || 11 || 19 || 2 || 2 || 141 || 212 || 353 || 89 || 59 || 0.1 || 0.1 || 7.4 || 11.2 || 18.6 || 4.7 || 3.1
|- style="background-color: #EAEAEA"
! scope="row" style="text-align:center" | 2008
|  || 11 || 23 || 3 || 1 || 239 || 264 || 503 || 134 || 75 || 0.1 || 0.0 || 10.4 || 11.5 || 21.9 || 5.8 || 3.3
|-
! scope="row" style="text-align:center" | 2009
|  || 11 || 24 || 8 || 1 || 255 || 266 || 521 || 127 || 89 || 0.3 || 0.0 || 10.6 || 11.1 || 21.7 || 5.3 || 3.7
|- style="background-color: #EAEAEA"
! scope="row" style="text-align:center" | 2010
|  || 11 || 22 || 1 || 1 || 200 || 211 || 411 || 114 || 74 || 0.0 || 0.0 || 9.1 || 9.6 || 18.7 || 5.2 || 3.4
|-
! scope="row" style="text-align:center" | 2011
| 
| 11
| 19
| 1
| 0
| 172
| 180
| 352
| 87
| 70
| 0.0
| 0.0
| 9.0
| 9.5
| 18.5
| 4.6
| 3.7
|- style="background-color: #EAEAEA"
! scope="row" style="text-align:center" | 2012
| 
| 11
| 24
| 2
| 1
| 206
| 167
| 373
| 100
| 74
| 0.1
| 0.0
| 8.6
| 7.0
| 15.5
| 4.2
| 3.1
|- class="sortbottom"
! colspan=3 | Career
! 231
! 46
! 30
! 1980
! 2024
! 4004
! 1073
! 670
! 0.2
! 0.1
! 8.6
! 8.8
! 17.3
! 4.6
! 2.9
|}

References

External links

 

1979 births
Living people
Australian rules footballers from South Australia
Australian people of English descent
Adelaide Football Club players
South Adelaide Football Club players
Reynella Football Club players